Wildflowers is the sixth studio album by American singer and songwriter Judy Collins, released by Elektra Records in 1967. It is her highest charting album to date, reaching No. 5 on the Billboard 200. It includes Collins' version of Joni Mitchell's "Both Sides, Now", which peaked at No. 8 on the Billboard Hot 100. 

The album was arranged by Joshua Rifkin and produced by Mark Abramson. Collins' recording of "Albatross" was used in the 1968 film adaptation of The Subject Was Roses. It was one of three self-penned tracks that appeared on the album, the first time that Collins wrote her own material. The collection also features three Leonard Cohen-penned tracks, including "Priests", a composition Cohen never released himself.

In 1969, Wildflowers was certified Gold by the RIAA for sales of over 500,000 copies in the US.

Track listing

Personnel
 Judy Collins – guitar, keyboards, vocals

Technical
 Joshua Rifkin – arranger (tracks 1–3, 5–10), conductor 
 Robert Sylvester – arranger (track 4)
 Robert Dennis – arranger (track 4)
 Mark Abramson – producer
 John Haeny – engineer
 Guy Webster – front cover photography
 Jim Frawley – back cover photography
 William S. Harvey – art direction, design

References

1967 albums
Albums produced by Mark Abramson
Judy Collins albums
Elektra Records albums
Albums arranged by Joshua Rifkin
Albums conducted by Joshua Rifkin